Ganja City Stadium is located in Ganja, Azerbaijan. It is used by Kapaz football club, and has a capacity of 26,120. In the 2016-17 domestic league season, tenants Kapaz PFK drew the highest average home attendance (8,096).

During the summer of 2017, the pitch at the Ganja City Stadium was relaid, with work being completed in October 2017.

References

Football venues in Azerbaijan
Sport in Ganja, Azerbaijan
Kapaz PFK